Damian Hopley  (born 12 April 1970) is a former rugby union player for London Wasps and England. His position of choice was on the wing or in the centres.

Background
Born in South London, Hopley attended St Benedict's School in Ealing West London where he represented first his School, County, Region and Country in rugby and Harrow School. Known by all who know him as "Hoppers", he was nicknamed the "vicar of rugby" in the Press, having studied theology at the University of St Andrews and Cambridge University and holds a Master of Theology degree. proceeding to a post graduate degree in education at Cambridge University where he won a Blue.

Career
Hopley continued playing rugby for his university side. He spent his entire playing career with London Wasps before retiring at only 26 due to injuries just months after the sport turned professional.

He was a member of the successful England sevens team that won the Melrose Cup in the inaugural IRB 1993 Rugby World Cup Sevens at Murrayfield. He won 3 caps for England and retired in 1998 after injuries forced him to retire at the age of 27.

Other work
Hopley is the founder and chief executive of the not-for-profit registered trade union Rugby Players' Association (RPA), launched in August 1998, as the representative body and collective voice of professional rugby union players in England.

Hopley was appointed Member of the Order of the British Empire (MBE) in the 2021 New Year Honours for services to rugby union football.

References

External links

1970 births
Living people
English rugby union players
Wasps RFC players
People educated at St Benedict's School, Ealing
People educated at Harrow School
Alumni of the University of St Andrews
Alumni of Hughes Hall, Cambridge
England international rugby union players
University of St Andrews RFC players
Rugby union players from London
England international rugby sevens players
Male rugby sevens players
Members of the Order of the British Empire